Ambattukavu  is a station of Kochi Metro. It was inaugurated by the Prime Minister of India, Narendra Modi, on 17 June 2017 and opened for public on 19 June as a part of the first stretch of the metro system, between Aluva and Palarivattom. The station is located between Companypady and Muttom.

References

Kochi Metro stations
Railway stations in India opened in 2017